Quane is a surname. Notable people with the surname include:

Adam Quane, musician
John Quane, Gaelic footballer
Michael Quane (born 1962), Irish sculptor
Mick Quane (born 1934), Irish hurler